The sixth generation of the BMW 3 Series consists of the BMW F30 (sedan version), BMW F31 (wagon version, marketed as 'Touring') and BMW F34 (fastback version, marketed as 'Gran Turismo') compact executive cars. The F30/F31/F34 generation was produced from October 2011 to 2019 and is often collectively referred to as the F30.

For the sixth generation, the coupé and convertible models were spun off to create the new BMW 4 Series nameplate. BMW also introduced a separate hatchback model under the 3 Series nameplate called the 3 Series Gran Turismo (F34).

The F30 is the first generation of 3 Series to be powered by a range of turbocharged engines exclusively and electric power steering (replacing the hydraulic power steering systems used previously). The F30 also marked the 3 Series' first use of a three-cylinder engine in its 2015 facelift. A new plug-in hybrid F30 model was also introduced in 2016. A long-wheelbase sedan version (model code F35) was sold in China.

The M3 model (designated F80) was introduced in 2014 and is powered by the S55 twin-turbocharged straight-six engine.

In March 2019, the BMW 3 Series (G20) was released as the successor to the F30. But the F34 fastback model continued to be available until early 2020. Later, it was replaced by BMW 4 Series Gran Coupé (G26) in June 2021.

Development and launch 
The exterior designer for the F30 sedan was Christopher Weil and exterior designer for the F31 Touring was Michael de Bono.

The F30 was unveiled in Munich on 14 October 2011, with market launch and first customer deliveries on 11 February 2012.

Body styles

Sedan (F30) 
The F30 sedan debuted at the 2012 Geneva Motor Show in March 2012 and was the first of the sixth generation 3 Series models to go on sale. Early models included the 328i and 335i and (post LCI) later models included the 330i and 340i. The 320i, 318d, and 316d models were added to the F30 range in March 2012. The 320i EfficientDynamics Edition and 316i were added in autumn of 2012.

In the United States, the arrival of the four-cylinder models marked the first time a 3 Series was sold with a four-cylinder petrol engine, since the E36 318i of the late 1990s. The 328i xDrive and 335i xDrive went on sale in the summer of 2012.

Touring (F31) 
The wagon/estate body style (marketed as "Touring") was unveiled at the 21st Auto Mobil International held at Leipzig in 2012. This body style has a designation of F31, and the launch models consisted of the 328i, 320d and the 330d. The 320i, 316d and 318d models were added in autumn of 2012.

Gran Turismo (F34) 
The 5-door fastback body style has a designation of F34 and is marketed as the 3 Series Gran Turismo, with styling similar to the 5 Series Gran Turismo. Although it features a rear hatchback, the 3 Series GT is not considered a successor to the 1993–2004 3 Series Compact 3-door hatchbacks. The Gran Turismo body style was discontinued for the following generation, the G20 3 Series as it proved to be unsuccessful in terms of sales.

At , the F34 is  longer than the sedan and Touring models. This extra length is partly facilitated by the  longer wheelbase shared with the F35 long wheelbase sedan models. The F34 is also  taller than the F30/F31. These increased dimensions result in the rear wheels being located further back and lower with respect to the rear seat, and allows for three full-size rear seats.

The F34 version was unveiled at the 83rd Geneva International Motor Show in 2013. At launch, the engine range consisted of turbocharged petrol and diesel engines in straight-4 and straight-6 configurations. All-wheel drive was available in the "i xDrive" and "d xDrive" models. The F34 received a facelift ("Life Cycle Impulse") in mid-2016, a year after the facelift was introduced for the other body styles of the F30 generation.

LWB sedan (F35) 
A long-wheelbase sedan model having a  designation of F35, was produced for the Chinese market. The vehicle was produced in BMW's Shenyang production plant, and has chrome trim on the doors to distinguish it from the regular F30 sedans.

The F35 was unveiled at 2012 Auto China in Beijing. Initial models included the 320Li, 328Li and 335Li. Post-facelift (LCI) models consisted of the 316Li, 320Li, 328Li, 328Li xDrive and 335Li.

Exterior styling 
The F30/F31 has grown in all dimensions compared to its predecessor. The styling is similar to previous generations with a sweeping bonnet, short front overhang, and long wheelbase. Headlamps now connect to a wide kidney grill. Tail lamps also sport a wide "L" shape design seen in many BMW models.

In some markets, in addition to the base and M Sport models, three 'trim lines' were available for this generation: Modern Line, Sport Line and Luxury Line. These lines form the base packages upon which extra options could be specified. The Modern Line was discontinued after the 2014 model year, due to low sales.

Luxury Line

Modern Line

Sport Line

M Sport

Interior and equipment

In the sedan models, the rear headroom, leg room and shoulder room increased compared with their E90 predecessors.

Options include heated front seats, split-fold rear seats, satellite navigation and a widescreen display in the centre console. The Bluetooth that's built-in into the car now supports audio streaming. The traditional mechanical shift lever was replaced by a shift by wire shifter (first used by BMW in the 2007 E70 X5).

M Performance Parts can be fitted to all models with the M Sport trim. These include sport brakes for 18 inch and higher wheels, side skirt ground effects, black kidney grilles and carbon fibre mirrors.

Engines 

The petrol models initially used the turbocharged 4-cylinder N13, 4-cylinder N20 and 6-cylinder N55 engines. This meant that the 328i models (traditionally powered by naturally-aspirated 6-cylinder engines) now used the turbocharged 4-cylinder N20 engine. For the 2016 facelift (LCI), the engines were updated to the 3-cylinder B38, the 4-cylinder B48 and the 6-cylinder B58.

The diesel models initially used the 4-cylinder N47 and 6-cylinder N57 turbocharged engines. For the 2016 facelift, the 4-cylinder models were updated to the B47 engine, while the 6-cylinder models retained the N57 engine.

Petrol

Diesel

Hybrid

Transmissions 
The available transmissions are:
 6-speed Getrag GS6-17BG manual
 6-speed ZF GS6-45BZ manual
 8-speed ZF 8HP45 automatic
 8-speed ZF 8HP50 automatic
 8-speed ZF 8HP70 automatic

M3 & M4 Models 

The M3 and M4 version [designated F80 for M3 (sedan) and F82 for M4 (coupe) the first time an M3 has used a separate model code, and the first time an M coupe was designated M4] was introduced in 2014. It is powered by the S55 twin-scroll-turbocharged straight-six engine. Production of the M3 ended in 2020. For the next generation M3/M4 (G80/G82) models released.

Special models

ActiveHybrid 3 

Based on the 335i Sedan, the ActiveHybrid 3 includes a  synchronous electric motor, a lithium-ion battery positioned underneath the luggage area and a 2-zone climate control system with stationary air conditioning. The electric motor generates  of torque.

The BMW ActiveHybrid 3 was unveiled at the North American International Auto Show in January 2012.

330e iPerformance 

The BMW 330e iPerformance is a plug-in hybrid unveiled at the IAA in Frankfurt in September 2015. The first units were registered in Europe by late 2015 and North American sales began in 2016.

The 330e features a four-cylinder petrol engine and an  electric motor. The United States EPA rated the 2016 BMW 330e energy consumption in all-electric mode at 47 kWh per 100 miles, which translates into a combined city/highway fuel economy of 72 miles per gallon gasoline equivalent (MPG-e) (3.3 L/100 km petrol equivalent), but only 14 miles all-electric range (Real world electric range under normal driving conditions mix of highway and city in eco mode is approximately 24km).

Alpina version 
The Alpina B3 (F30) was based on the F30 3 Series.

Model year changes

2013 
 All-wheel drive became available for the wagon body style in the 320i, 328i and 335i models.

2014 
 328d is the first four-cylinder diesel BMW to be sold in the United States. The built in iDrive infotainment system software was also redesigned with new navigation and connectivity features.

2015 Facelift (LCI) 

The facelift ("Life Cycle Impulse") versions were released in 2015 for the 2016 model year. Changes include:
 340i models (using the B58 engine) replace the 335i models (using the N55 engine).
 330i model (using the B48 engine) replaces the 328i model (using the N20 engine), except for the United States market.
 320i engine changes to B48 from N20, except for the United States market.
 318i model (using the 3-cylinder B38 engine) replaces the 316i and 320i  (using the 4-cylinder N13 engine) (therefore, for the first time in its 40-year history, the 318i model isn't powered by a 4-cylinder engine).
 B47 engine replaces the N47 engine for the 4-cylinder diesel models.
 ActiveHybrid 3 model discontinued.
 330e iPerformance plug-in hybrid model added.
 Revised headlights and tail-lights, with LED replacing Xenon for the headlights.
 Revised shock absorbers and front suspension mounts.
 Revised electronic stability control (called "DSC" by BMW).
 Rev-matching (called "engine speed adaption" by BMW) for manual transmissions.
 GPS-based gear selection (called "ConnectedShift" by BMW) for automatic transmissions.
 Bluetooth audio streaming (A2DP) was added as standard equipment to the audio system.

Safety

Euro NCAP

IIHS

NHTSA

ASEAN NCAP

Marketing 

The BMW 320d Efficient Dynamics was the most widely used vehicle in the London 2012 Olympics due to BMW's official partnership.

Production 
Production of F30 generation began with the sedan body style on 28 October 2011. Production ended in 2019 with the end of F31 Touring production in June.

The sedan and wagon models were produced in Germany (Munich and Regensburg), South Africa (Rosslyn, up until 2018), India (Chennai), China (Shenyang) and Brazil (Araquari). The Gran Turismo models were produced at the BMW Dingolfing plant in Germany. Local assembly of complete knock-down (CKD) kits was used for cars sold in Egypt, Indonesia, Malaysia, Russia and Thailand.

Sales 
The following are the sales of the 3 Series, according to BMW's annual reports:

References 

F30 F31
3 Series
Cars introduced in 2011
Cars introduced in 2012
Compact executive cars
ASEAN NCAP large family cars
Euro NCAP large family cars
Plug-in hybrid vehicles